The Algeria Davis Cup team represents Algeria in Davis Cup tennis competition and are governed by the Fédération Algerienne de Tennis.

Algeria currently compete in Africa Zone Group III.  They have reached the Group II quarterfinals each of the last three years.

History
Algeria competed in its first Davis Cup in 1976.

Current team (2022) 

 Rayan Ghedjemis
 Samir Hamza Reguig
 Toufik Sahtali
 Aymen Abderrahmene Ali Moussa
 Mohamed Amine Aissa Khelifa

See also
Davis Cup
Algeria Fed Cup team

External links

Davis Cup teams
Davis Cup
Davis Cup